"Tea in the Sahara" is a song by the British new wave band the Police. Written by Sting, the song appeared on the band's final album, Synchronicity. It was written about the  Paul Bowles novel The Sheltering Sky.

A live version of "Tea in the Sahara" appeared as the B-side to "King of Pain" in Britain and "Wrapped Around Your Finger" in America.

Background
The lyrics of "Tea in the Sahara" were inspired by the Paul Bowles book The Sheltering Sky.  The first section of that book is called "Tea in the Sahara."  In it, the character Port is told a story, in which three sisters wait for a prince to join them for tea in the Sahara Desert, but the prince never returns. Sting was a fan of the novel, and based the lyrics of the song on the story.

Guitarist Andy Summers, who claimed to have been the one who gave Sting The Sheltering Sky, used a special technique in recording his guitar part for the song, involving turning the guitar up to near-feedback levels and "wobbling" it.

Ultimate Classic Rock critic Mike Duquette described the song as "a fable about broken promises."

Despite Sting's affection for the song, he has since said that the track was too fast. He said in 1993, "I've always loved the song. There's so much space in it. But I think we played it too fast on the album and live."

The song was used as background music in "The Maze", a first-season episode of Miami Vice.

Live version
In addition to its studio release on Synchronicity, a live version of "Tea in the Sahara" from the Synchronicity Tour, was released as the B-side to "King of Pain" in Britain and "Wrapped Around Your Finger" in America. This version also appeared on Message in a Box: The Complete Recordings.

This version of "Tea in the Sahara" was not the only live release of the track. A version from Sting's first solo tour can be found on his live album, Bring on the Night, while a version from a Sting MTV Unplugged session appeared on the 1993 "If I Ever Lose My Faith in You" CD single.

Personnel
Sting – lead vocals, bass guitar, oboe
Andy Summers – guitar
Stewart Copeland – drums

Charts

Notes

References

The Police songs
Songs written by Sting (musician)
1983 songs
1984 singles
Live singles
Song recordings produced by Hugh Padgham
Music based on novels